is a 2021 Japanese anime film produced by Shin-Ei Animation. It is the 29th film of the anime series Crayon Shin-chan. The director of the film is Wataru Takahashi and screenplay is written by Kimiko Ueno.

Synopsis 
The film's story begins with Shinnosuke and his friends of "Kasukabe Defence Force" experiencing a one-week stay in "Tenkatōitsu Kasukabe Private Academy" (nicknamed "Tenkazu"), an elite boarding school that is administrated by a state-of-the-art AI, "Otsmun". All the students are given a badge initially with 1000 points and their points are increased/decreased by Otsmun based on their behaviors and academic performance. In there someone attacks Kazama. As a result, his intelligence is reduced, and strange bite marks are left on his butt. The Kasukabe Defense Force joins forces with the school's dropout student council president Chishio Atsuki, who was a former athlete, to form a group of detectives and solve the mystery.

Cast 
 Yumiko Kobayashi as Shinnosuke Nohara
 Miki Narahashi as Misae Nohara
 Toshiyuki Morikawa as Hiroshi Nohara
 Satomi Kōrogi as Himawari Nohara
 Mari Mashiba as Toru Kazama and Shiro
 Tamao Hayashi as Nene Sakurada
 Teiyū Ichiryūsai as Masao Sato
 Chie Satō as Bo Suzuki
 Ryō Hirohashi as Chishio Atsuki
 Tetsu Inada as Ringleader
 Yoshiko Kamei as Homeroom teacher
 Ayumu Murase as Sasuga
 Ayaka Saitō as Nororo
 Rei Sakuma as Otsumun
 Taro Yamaguchi as Headmaster of Tenkazu Academy
 Riisa Naka as Ageha
 Osada Shouhei (Chocolate Planet) as Yoyo, the delinquents of Class Kasu
 Matsuo Shun (Chocolate Planet) as Kyuushoku Bukuro (Lunch bag) 
 Fuwa-chan as herself

Music 
 Hashirigaki (Jottings): Macaroni Enpitsu

Release 
The film was initially scheduled to be released on April 23, 2021 in Japan, but was postponed to July 30, 2021 due to the COVID-19 pandemic. It was later released by Muse Communication in Singapore on September 9, 2021, and in Malaysia on November 18 as Crayon Shin-chan: School Mystery! The Splendid Tenkasu Academy. The film is released on Blu-ray and DVD on 4 February 2022.

Box office
Here is a table which shows the box office of this movie of all the weekends in Japan:

See also 
 List of Crayon Shin-chan films

References

External links 
  (archived)
 

Shrouded in Mystery! The Flowers of Tenkazu Academy
2021 anime films
Anime postponed due to the COVID-19 pandemic
Films postponed due to the COVID-19 pandemic
Toho animated films
11